João Miguel Passos Manuel Pica (born 8 April 1986) is a Portuguese professional footballer who plays for AD Castro Daire as a central defender.

Club career
Pica was born in Moura, Alentejo. Until the age of 23, he alternated between the third and fourth divisions of Portuguese football, representing Vitória de Setúbal B, O Elvas C.A.D. and G.D. Ribeirão.

In the summer of 2009, Pica signed for Segunda Liga club Varzim S.C. and, on 8 August, made his professional debut in a 1–0 home win against C.D. Fátima in the first round of the Taça da Liga. In January 2011, he moved to fellow league side Moreirense FC.

In June 2012, after spending one season with C.D. Tondela in division three on loan, Pica agreed to a permanent deal after helping to promotion to the second tier. In the 2014–15 campaign, he contributed 19 games and one goal as his team reached the Primeira Liga for the first time in their history and, subsequently, renewed his expiring contract for a further year.

Pica played his first match in the top flight on 20 December 2015, featuring the full 90 minutes in a 1–3 home loss to Vitória de Setúbal. Initially fourth or fifth-choice stopper, he was an everpresent figure in the season's final stretch, scoring three goals in seven games as Tondela avoided relegation in the last matchday.

On 27 June 2017, Pica joined Académico de Viseu F.C. of the second division.

References

External links

1986 births
Living people
People from Moura, Portugal
Sportspeople from Beja District
Portuguese footballers
Association football defenders
Primeira Liga players
Liga Portugal 2 players
Segunda Divisão players
Vitória F.C. players
O Elvas C.A.D. players
G.D. Ribeirão players
Varzim S.C. players
Moreirense F.C. players
C.D. Tondela players
Académico de Viseu F.C. players